Rogelio Ruvalcaba (born 11 September 1988) is a Mexican professional boxer. As an amateur, he competed at the 2009 Panamerican Championships.

Amateur career
Ruvalcaba is a Mexican Junior National Champion. He then won a bronze and two silver medals at the Mexican National Amateur Championships in the Elite Category. He reached the quarterfinals of the 2009 Panamerican Championships, where he was eliminated by Lenin Castillo.

Professional career
Ruvalcaba made his professional debut on 27 August 2010, defeating Israel Villa via first-round technical knockout in Tijuana.

References

External links

Boxers from Baja California
Sportspeople from Tijuana
Light-heavyweight boxers
1988 births
Living people
Mexican male boxers